Sun Yeneng is Goh Keng Swee Professor of Economics and Professor of Mathematics at the National University of Singapore (NUS). Sun received his B.S. from University of Science and Technology of China in 1983 and his M.S. and Ph.D from University of Illinois at Urbana-Champaign respectively in 1985 and 1989. He joined NUS as a lecturer at the Department of Mathematics in 1989 and was promoted to professor in 2002. He was Raffles Professor of Social Sciences at the Department of Economics in NUS from 2009 to 2015. 

Sun was formerly appointed as acting head and head in the Department of Economics in 2008 to 2012. He has been Dean of Faculty of Science from 1 July 2020.

Research Interests
Sun's research interests include mathematical economics, analysis and probability theory.

Selected works

Awards and honors 
Sun has been a Economic Theory Fellow of the Society for the Advancement of Economic Theory since 2011, 
and a Fellow of the Singapore National Academy of Science since 2014.

References

External links
Homepage at NUS

Singaporean mathematicians
Singaporean economists
Academic staff of the National University of Singapore
National University of Singapore deans
Living people
University of Science and Technology of China alumni
University of Illinois Urbana-Champaign alumni
Year of birth missing (living people)